Grand Surprise may refer to:

Archambault Grand Surprise, a French sailboat design
Grand surprise, a common name of the moth Nymphalis antiopa found in Eurasia and North America

See also
Surprise (disambiguation)